Sage Nunataks are two ice-free nunataks, 1 nautical mile (1.9 km) apart, located at the edge of the Ross Ice Shelf just north of Mount Justman and the Gabbro Hills. Named by Advisory Committee on Antarctic Names (US-ACAN) for Richard H. Sage, builder, U.S. Navy, a member of the winter party at Byrd Station in 1959 and the South Pole Station in 1964.

Nunataks of the Ross Dependency
Amundsen Coast